Romanek is a surname. Notable people with the surname include:

 János Romanek (born 1966), Hungarian footballer
 Łukasz Romanek (1983–2006), Polish motorsport racer
 Mark Romanek (born 1959), American filmmaker
 Stan Romanek (born 1962), American writer and UFO enthusiast